Luke Gullick (born 1986) is an English footballer who plays for Pontypridd Town in Wales. Sometimes used as a winger at Chippenham Town, he is able to be put in any position, including defense.

Trinidad and Tobago

Traveling to Trinidad and Tobago in 2009 to trial for San Juan Jabloteh, Gullick harbored ambitions to get called up to the Trinidad and Tobago national team in time for the 2010 FIFA World Cup but they never qualified so he couldn't participate in the event, getting recalled to Chippenham Town following the unsuccessful trial where he performed well upon return.

Earning a six-month deal with San Juan Jabloteh in 2011 and staying with his cousins throughout his spell there, the Englishman notched his first goal in a 4-4 stalemate with T&TEC, claiming that the gameplay there was 'fast and strong'. He then trained with Newport County in Wales before returning to Chippenham Town in 2012.

Personal life

The forward has been a fervid supporter of Chippenham Town since he was 12.

His mother Anne's side of the family hail from Trinidad and his cousin Akeem once directed a professional club there.

References

External links 
 
 Interview With Luke Gullick Adam's Construction San Juan Jabloteh FC
 Gullick laments poor performance
 at Footballdatabase.eu

Expatriate footballers in Trinidad and Tobago
TT Pro League players
1987 births
Association football forwards
English expatriate footballers
Chippenham Town F.C. players
Expatriate footballers in Wales
English sportspeople of Trinidad and Tobago descent
Living people
English footballers
San Juan Jabloteh F.C. players
Calne Town F.C. players
Swindon Supermarine F.C. players